Ali Fuad Masrahi (born 13 October 2001) is a Saudi Arabian professional footballer who plays as a defender and left back for Saudi Professional League side Al-Ettifaq.

Career
Masrahi started his career at the youth team of Al-Ettifaq and represented the club at every level.

References

External links
 

2001 births
Living people
Saudi Arabian footballers
Association football defenders
Association football fullbacks
Ettifaq FC players
Saudi Professional League players